On June 25, 1965, during the Vietnam War, a series of two bombings by the Viet Cong took place in Saigon killing 42 people in the explosions.

My Canh Café 
The first bomb detonated at 8:15 p.m. (local time) in a floating restaurant "My Canh Café" on the banks of the Saigon River. 31–32 people were killed, and 42 were wounded. Of the casualties, 13 were American and most others were Vietnamese citizens.

Second bombing 
At the same time as the first blast another bomb exploded next to a tobacco stall on the bank of the river near the floating restaurant. The blast killed at least one American woman.

References

Saigon Bombing
Explosions in 1965
Saigon
Vietnam War
June 1965 events in Asia
History of Ho Chi Minh City
Vietnam War crimes by the Viet Cong
Communist terrorist incidents in Asia